Belgrano is a department of San Luis Province, Argentina.

With an area of  it borders to the north with the departments of Ayacucho, to the east with Ayacucho and Coronel Pringles, to the south with Juan Martín de Pueyrredón, and to the west with Mendoza Province.

Municipalities 
 La Calera
 Nogolí
 Villa de la Quebrada
 Villa General Roca

Villages 
 Alto Tavira
 Árbol Solo
 Bajo del Durazno
 Barrial
 Bella Estancia
 Buen Orden
 Cabeza de Vaca
 Cañada de Vilán
 Divisadero
 El Chañar
 El Dichoso
 El Gigante
 El Jarillal
 El Milagro
 El Ramblón
 El Recodo
 El Sosiego
 Hualtarán
 La Aurora
 La Perlita
 Las Brisas
 Los Araditos
 Los Cerrillos
 Los Ramblones
 Pozo del Tala
 Puerta de la Quebrada
 Represa del Carmen
 San Antonio
 San Isidro
 Vizcachera
 Toro Negro

References

External links 
 Provincial website

Departments of San Luis Province